Finland competed at the 1980 Summer Olympics in Moscow, USSR. 105 competitors, 99 men and 6 women, took part in 71 events in 16 sports.

Medalists

Gold
Tomi Poikolainen — Archery, Men's Competition
Pertti Karppinen — Rowing, Men's Single Sculls
Esko Rechardt — Sailing, Men's Finn Competition

Silver
Kaarlo Maaninka — Athletics, Men's 10.000 metres

Bronze
Päivi Meriluoto — Archery, Women's Competition
Kaarlo Maaninka — Athletics, Men's 5.000 metres
Mikko Huhtala — Wrestling, Men's Greco-Roman Welterweight
Jouko Lindgrén and Georg Tallberg — Sailing, Men's 470 Competition

Archery

For the first time, Finland entered women in the Olympic archery competition. They were quite successful, with Päivi Meriluoto winning a bronze medal. The Finnish men, competing for the third time, both placed in the top eight as Tomi Poikolainen won Finland's first gold medal in archery. Kyösti Laasonen, who had competed in every Olympics since the reinstatement of archery, took seventh.

Women's Individual Competition:
Päivi Meriluoto — 2.449 points (→  Bronze Medal)
Capita Jussila — 2.298 points (→ 14th place)

Men's Individual Competition:
Tomi Poikolainen — 2.455 points (→  Gold Medal)
Kyösti Laasonen — 2.419 points (→ 7th place)

Athletics

Men's 1,500 metres
Antti Loikkanen
 Heat — 3:40.5
 Semifinals — 3:43.6 (→ did not advance)

Men's 5,000 metres
 Kaarlo Maaninka
 Heat — 13:45.8
 Semi Final — 13:40.2
 Final — 13:22.0 (→  Bronze Medal)
 Martti Vainio
 Heat — 13:45.2
 Semi Final — 13:30.4
 Final — 13:32.1 (→ 11th place)

Men's 10,000 metres
 Kaarlo Maaninka
 Heat — 28:31.0
 Final — 27:44.3 (→  Silver Medal)
 Lasse Virén
 Heat — 28:45.8
 Final — 27:50.5 (→ 5th place)
 Martti Vainio
 Heat — 28:59.9
 Final — 28:46.3 (→ 13th place)

Men's Marathon
 Håkan Spik
 Final — 2:22:24 (→ 32nd place)
 Lasse Virén
 Final — did not finish (→ no ranking)
 Jouni Kortelainen
 Final — did not finish (→ no ranking)

Men's 110 m Hurdles
 Arto Bryggare
 Heat — 13.77
 Semifinals — 13.78
 Final — 13.76 (→ 6th place)

Men's 3,000 m Steeplechase
 Tommy Ekblom
 Heat — 8:27.8 
 Semifinals — 8:24.3
 Final — 8:40.9 (→ 12th place)
 Vesa Laukkanen
 Heat — 8:38.4 
 Semifinals — 8:33.3 (→ did not advance)

Men's 20 km Walk
 Reima Salonen
 Final — 1:31:32.0 (→ 9th place)

Men's 50 km Walk
 Reima Salonen
 Final — did not finish (→ no ranking)

Men's Long Jump
 Oli Pousi
 Qualification — did not start (→ no ranking)

Men's Triple Jump
Olli Pousi
 Qualification — no mark (→ did not advance)

Men's Shot Put
Reijo Ståhlberg
 Qualification — 20.53 m
 Final — 20.82 m (→ 4th place)

Men's Discus Throw
 Markku Tuokko
 Qualification — 62.14 m
 Final — 61.84 m (→ 9th place)

Men's Hammer Throw
Harri Huhtala
 Qualification — 72.46 m
 Final Round — 71.96 m (→ 9th place)
Juha Tiainen
 Qualification — 70.82 m
 Final Round — 71.38 m (→ 10th place)

Men's Javelin Throw
 Antero Puranen
 Qualification — 84.02 m
 Final — 86.15 m (→ 5th place)
 Pentti Sinersaari
 Qualification — 80.30 m
 Final — 84.34 m (→ 6th place)
 Aimo Aho
 Qualification — 82.12 m
 Final — 80.58 m (→ 9th place)

Men's Pole Vault
 Tapani Haapakoski
 Qualification — 5.40 m
 Final — 5.45 m (→ 9th place)
 Rauli Pudas
 Qualification — 5.35 m
 Final — 5.25 m (→ 12th place)
 Antti Kalliomäki
 Qualification — no mark (→ did not advance)

Men's Decathlon
 Esa Jokinen
 Final — 7826 points (→ 9th place)
 Johannes Lahti
 Final — 7765 points (→ 11th place)

Women's 100 metres
 Helinä Laihorinne
 Heat — 11.70
 Quarterfinals — did not finish (→ did not advance)

Women's Discus Throw
 Ulla Lundholm
 Qualification — DNS (→ did not advance)

Women's Javelin Throw
 Tiina Lillak
 Qualification — 56.26 m (→ did not advance)

Boxing

Men's Light Flyweight (– 48 kg)
Antti Juntumaa
 First Round — Defeated Beruk Asfaw (Ethiopia) after knock-out in first round 
 Second Round — Lost to Dumitru Şchiopu (Romania) on points (1-4)

Men's Bantamweight (– 54 kg)
Veli Koota
 First Round — Bye
 Second Round — Defeated Fazlija Sacirovic (Yugoslavia) after referee stopped contest in second round 
 Third Round — Lost to Bernardo Piñango (Venezuela) after diskwalification in second round

Men's Featherweight (– 57 kg)
Hannu Kaislama
 First Round — Lost to Rudi Fink (East Germany) on points (0-5)

Men's Welterweight (– 67 kg)
Martti Marjamaa
 First Round — Defeated Roland Omoruyi (Nigeria) on points (5-0) 
 Second Round — Lost to Ionel Budusan (Romania) after referee stopped contest in third round

Men's Middleweight (– 75 kg)
Tarmo Uusivirta
 First Round — Bye 
 Second Round — Lost to Jerzy Rybicki (Poland) after referee stopped contest in second round

Canoeing

Cycling

Five cyclists represented Finland in 1980.

Individual road race
 Harry Hannus
 Kari Puisto
 Mauno Uusivirta
 Sixten Wackström

Team time trial
 Harry Hannus
 Kari Puisto
 Patrick Wackström
 Sixten Wackström

Individual pursuit
 Sixten Wackström

Men's sprint
 Paul Ahokas

Equestrian

Fencing

Five fencers, all men, represented Finland in 1980.

Men's épée
 Heikki Hulkkonen
 Mikko Salminen
 Peder Planting

Men's team épée
 Heikki Hulkkonen, Kimmo Puranen, Peter Grönholm, Peder Planting, Mikko Salminen

Football

Men's Team Competition
Preliminary Round (Group D)
 Lost to Yugoslavia (0-2)
 Drew with Iraq (0-0)
 Defeated Costa Rica (3-0)
Quarter Finals
 Did not qualify
Team Roster
 Olli Isoaho
 Aki Lahtinen
 Juha Helin
 Kari Virtanen
 Hannu Turunen
 Juha Dahllund
 Vesa Pulliainen
 Juhani Himanka
 Ari Tissari
 Jouko Alila
 Jouko Kataja
 Teuvo Vilen
 Raimo Kuuluvainen
 Tomi Jalo
 Jouko Soini
 Juha Rissanen

Judo

Modern pentathlon

Three male pentathletes represented Finland in 1980.

Men's Individual Competition:
Heikki Hulkkonen — 5227 pts, 10th place
Jussi Pelli — 5032 pts, 24th place 
Pekka Santanen — 4828 pts, 31st place

Men's Team Competition:
Hulkkonen, Pelli, and Santanen — 15.087 pts, 7th place

Rowing

Sailing

Shooting

Swimming

Men's 100m Breaststroke
Martti Järventaus

Men's 200m Breaststroke
Martti Järventaus

Weightlifting

Wrestling

References

1980 Summer Olympics
Nations at the 1980 Summer Olympics
S